Georgios Kokkinis (Greek: Γεώργιος Κοκκίνης; born 27 April 1989) is a Greek footballer. He currently plays for Ialysos F.C.. He plays as central defender and can also play as left back.

Club career 
Born in Krinos, Achaea, Kokkinis began his football career with local side Krinos F.C. and Atromitos Achaea F.C. at the age of 11. Six years later, in 2007, he signed his first professional contract at Egaleo F.C. In the summer of 2008, Kokkinis transferred to Ilisiakos F.C. A year later, he returned to Egaleo F.C., where he stayed for one year. In 2010, he signed with Ethnikos Piraeus F.C.; a year later, in 2011, Kokkinis signed with Panachaiki. He stayed there for two and a half years. On 10 January 2014, he signed with Panelefsiniakos F.C. for half a year. In the summer of 2014 Dotieas Agia F.C. announced the agreement with the player for one year and on 26 April Kokkinis scored twice for Dotieas Agia F.C. After a successful year in dotieas, Kokkinis moved to Rhodes on 27 July 2015 and signed a one-year contract with Football League 2 side Ialysos F.C. for the 2015-2016 season.

References 

1989 births
Living people
Greek footballers
Association football defenders
Panelefsiniakos F.C. players
Egaleo F.C. players
Ilisiakos F.C. players
Ethnikos Asteras F.C. players
Panachaiki F.C. players
People from Achaea
Footballers from Western Greece